The 1970–71 Bulgarian Cup was the 31st season of the Bulgarian Cup (in this period the tournament was named Cup of the Soviet Army). Levski Sofia won the competition, beating Lokomotiv Plovdiv 3–0 in the final at the Bulgarian Army Stadium.

First round

|-
!colspan=3 style="background-color:#D0F0C0;" |16 December 1970

|}

Group stage

Group 1
Matches were played in Pazardzhik and Velingrad

|-
!colspan=3 style="background-color:#D0F0C0;" |20–28 February 1971

|}

Group 2
Matches were played in Petrich and Sandanski

|-
!colspan=3 style="background-color:#D0F0C0;" |20–28 February 1971

|}

Group 3
Matches were played in Stara Zagora and Nova Zagora

|-
!colspan=3 style="background-color:#D0F0C0;" |20–28 February 1971

|}

Group 4
Matches were played in Haskovo and Dimitrovgrad

|-
!colspan=3 style="background-color:#D0F0C0;" |22–28 February 1971

|}

Quarter-finals

Semi-finals

Final

Details

References

1970-71
1970–71 domestic association football cups
Cup